The 2007 Team Speedway Junior World Championship is the third FIM Team Speedway Junior World Championship season. The Final took place on 23 September 2007 in Abensberg, Germany.

The World Championship was won by Poland U-21. It was third title for Poland. Poland team is only team who was won this competition (first staged in 2005). It was also a third title for Poland' captain Karol Ząbik and second title for Paweł Hlib and Krzysztof Buczkowski.

In the final, Poland (40 points) beat Great Britain (36 pts), Czech Republic (30 pts) and Germany (13 pts). It was first medals for the British and Czech teams. The title was won after 19th heat, when Buczkowski beat Britain's Lewis Bridger. Czech Republic lost the chance for the silver medal after the 19th when their captain Luboš Tomíček, Jr. was last.

Calendar

Qualification

Semifinal 1
 June 3, 2007
  Poznań
 Jury President:  Armando Castagna
 Attendance: 3,500

Semifinal 2
 June 3, 2007
  Debrecen

World Final
 September 23, 2007
 , Abensberg

References 

 Świat Żużla, No 4 (42) /2007, pages 59,

See also
2007 Speedway World Cup

2007
World Team Junior